KMUL-FM (103.1 FM) is a radio station broadcasting a Hit Country format. It is licensed to Muleshoe, Texas, United States. The station is owned by Tallgrass Broadcasting.

History
The station went on the air as KMUL-FM on April 4, 1980. On April 1, 1993, the station changed its call sign to DKMUL-FM, on 1998-09-11 to the current KMUL.

References

External links

MUL-FM